United Nations Administered Kosovo refers to the period between  1999 and 2008 when the United Nations Interim Administration Mission in Kosovo was directly responsible for the governance of Kosovo. This period began on 10 June 1999 with the passing of United Nations Security Council Resolution 1244 and effectively ended on 17 February 2008 with the unilateral declaration of independence of Kosovo.

Background

In 1945, at the conclusion of the Second World War, Kosovo was organised within the Socialist Federal Republic of Yugoslavia (SFRY) as the Autonomous Region of Kosovo and Metohija. In 1963 the region was reorganised as the Autonomous Province of Kosovo and Metohija with increased autonomy and was renamed renamed Socialist Autonomous Province of Kosovo in 1968. In 1975 Kosovo was granted significantly increased levels of autonomy. In 1990, under the regime of Slobodan Milošević, the level of autonomy was reduced and the official name reverted to the Autonomous Province of Kosovo and Metohija.

In 1991, during the Breakup of Yugoslavia, Ethnic Albanian representatives of Provincial Assembly unilaterally declared the Republic of Kosova and established parallel instructions for education, medical care, and taxation. Serbia and Montenegro formed the Federal Republic of Yugoslavia (FRY) in April 1992. Ethnic tensions increased between Yugoslav authorities and the Ethnic Albanian guerilla movement, the Kosovo Liberation Army, resulting in the Kosovo War breaking out in February 1998. In March 1999, NATO proposed the Rambouillet Agreement which would have grated Kosovo substantial autonomy within the Federal Republic of Yugoslavia. The agreement was accepted by the Ethnic Albanian side but rejected by the Yugoslav side prompting the NATO bombing of Yugoslavia on 24 March 1999. On 9 June 1999, NATO and the Federal Republic Yugoslavia reached the Kumanovo Agreement whereby Kosovo would be placed under United Nations administration. This arrangement was formalised by the passing of United Nations Security Council Resolution 1244 on 10 June 1999 which established the United Nations Interim Administration Mission in Kosovo.

Kosovo unilaterally declared independence on 17 February 2008 as the Republic of Kosovo. Serbia continues to claim Kosovo as the Autonomous Province of Kosovo and Metohija.

Administrative history

United Nations Security Council Resolution 1244 allowed for the  "[deployment] in Kosovo, under United Nations auspices, [an] international civil and security [presence]". The first regulation passed by the Special Representative of the Secretary General, on 25 July 1999, established that UNMIK was responsible for all legislative and executive authority in Kosovo. That regulation also stated that all laws applicable in Kosovo prior to 24 March 1999 would continue to apply in Kosovo insofar as they do not conflict with "internationally recognized human rights standards and shall not discriminate against any person on any ground such as sex, race, colour, language, religion, political or other opinion, national, ethnic or social origin, association with a national community, property, birth or other status". This was later amended to state that the law applicable would be that as it stood on 22 March 1989.

Initial arrangements
A twelve-member Kosovo Transitional Council was formed on 16 July 1999. Chaired by the SRSG, the KTC was the described as being the highest political consultative body within the United Nations administration. Its purpose was to offer the main political parties and ethnic communities in Kosovo an opportunity for direct input into the decision-making process of UNMIK.

Joint Interim Administrative Structure

A more formal system of administration was put in place on 30 January 2000 when a Joint Interim Administrative Structure was established. The membership of the Kosovo Transitional Council was expanded and it assumed the role of a deliberative assembly. A transitional cabinet, known as the Interim Administrative Council, was established with eight members, four of which were appointed by UNMIK and four by political parties in Kosovo.

Provisional Institutions of Self Government

Resolution 1244 permitted the United Nations to establish and oversee the development of "provisional, democratic self-governing institutions" in Kosovo. To achieve this aim, a Constitutional Framework for Self-Government in Kosovo was promulgated in May which would established Provisional Institutions of Self-Government. The institutions included establishing a directly elected Assembly of Kosovo which would nominate a  President and a Government led by a Prime Minister. Elections for the new assembly were held on 17 November 2001 and on 4 March 2002, Ibrahim Rugova was appointed as President and a cabinet was formed led by  Bajram Rexhepi as Prime.

Office Holders

Special Representative of the Secretary-General

President of Kosovo

 Parties

Prime Minister of Kosovo

 Parties

Cabinets

Elections

Central
Prior to the declaration of independence of Kosovo in February 2008, three elections were held for the Provisional Institutions of Self-Government:
2001 Kosovan parliamentary election
2004 Kosovan parliamentary election
2007 Kosovan parliamentary election

Local
Three local elections were held in Kosovo during the period of direct UN administration:
 2000 Kosovan local elections
 2002 Kosovan local elections
 2007 Kosovan local elections

Local government

At the start of the period of United Nations administration Kosovo had been divided into five districts. Reforms initiated by UNMIK in 2000 increased the number of districts to seven which were; District of Mitrovica, District of Peja, District of Gjakova, District of Pristina, District of Ferizaj, District of Prizren and District of Gjilan.

The districts of Kosovo are divided into municipalities. In 2000, UNMIK merged the municipalities of Gora and Opolje to form the new the new municipality of Dragash and created a new municipality, Malisheva in Prizren district. New Serb majority municipalities were subsequently created along with the Turkish majority municipality of Mamusha. By 2008, the number of municipalities stood at 38 of which 27 had an Albanian ethnic majority, 10 Serb and 1 Turkish.

Initially, municipalities were administered by Municipal Administrative Boards headed by Municipal Administrators appointed by UNMIK. Local elections were first held on 28 October 2000 to elect Municipal Assemblies for each municipality. Each Municipal Assembly was headed by an Assembly President elected by the members of its Municipal Assembly from within its membership. Further local elections were held on 26 October 2002 under the same model. At the final set of local elections held under United Nations administration on 17 November 2007, each municipality directly elected a Mayor in addition to its Municipal Assembly.

Security and law enforcement
The Kumanovo Agreement, which ended the Kosovo War, and Resolution 1244 required that the Federal Republic of Yugoslavia withdrew its military, paramilitary forces and police from Kosovo. The resolution also required that the Kosovo Liberation Army and other armed Kosovo Albanian armed groups be disbanded. Security in Kosovo was to be provided by a NATO-led intonational peacekeeping force known as the Kosovo Force (KFOR).

On 21 September 1999, UNMIK established a civil defence service known as the Kosovo Protection Corps to assist in emergency situations such as major fires, industrial accidents, search and rescue operations, humanitarian assistance and demining. The KPC could have up to 3000 full time officers and 2000 reservists of which 10 percent should be from ethnic minority groups. The KPC would not have any role in law enforcement.

Initially law and order in Kosovo was maintained by a United Nations International Police Force. On 6 September 1999, UNMIK established a police school in Vushtrri to train officers for the new Kosovo Police Service which would gradually take over policing duties as it expanded in size and developed further capabilities.

International relations

Membership of international organizations

During the period of direct administration by UNMIK, Kosovo gained membership of the following international organisations:

Free trade agreements
UNMIK signed free trade agreements on behalf of Kosovo with Albania in July 2003 and with North Macedonia in 2005.

Travel documents
Between 2000 and 2008, UNMIK issued passport-sized travel documents to habitual residents of Kosovo for the purpose of foreign travel.
The document carried UNMIK travel document/titre de voyage on the cover, contained 32 pages and was valid for two years. The document contained a machine readable strip with the three-letter code "UNK" in place of a country code.

Sport

 
In 2003 the Assembly of Kosovo passed the Law on Sports (Law No. 2003/24) which designated the Olympic Committee of Kosovo (OCK) as the highest sports institution in Kosovo  The OCK would not become a member of the International Olympic Committee until 2014, after the unilateral declaration of Independence. Unlike the case for East Timor, athletes from Kosovo did not take part as independents at the Olympic Games during the period of UN administration. A Special Olympics association for Kosovo was formed in 2002 and athletes from Kosovo took part in the Special Olympics World Games in 2003 and 2007. Athletes from Kosovo also participated at the fourth World Dwarf Games in Rambouillet, France in 2005.

A Kosovo Football Federation had been established as a branch of the Football Association of Yugoslavia in 1946. A representative team for Kosovo played several unofficial friendly matches between 2002 and 2008 including matches against Albania, Saudi Arabia and Monaco.

At least twenty-three sports federations existed during the period of United Nations administration of which three; the Table Tennis Federation of Kosovo, Handball Federation of Kosovo and Special Olympics Kosovo gained affiliation with their respective international governing body.

Media and communications

Postal services

Kosovo had operated its own postal service within the Socialist Federal Republic of Yugoslavia since 1959. At that time Yugoslav postage stamps were in use. After Kosovo came under United Nations administration, UNMIK became responsible for issuing postage stamps for Kosovo. The first UNMIK issued stamps were released on 15 March 2002 based on the theme of "peace". Further sets were issued by UNMIK up until Kosovo unilaterally declared independence after which stamps were issued in the name of the Republic of Kosovo.

Telecommunications
The Post, Telephone and Telegraph of Kosovo (PTK) was established in 1959. During the Kosovo conflict, assets of the company were either stolen or destroyed, leading to the interruption telecommunication services. After the conflict, PTK launched Vala, the largest mobile operator in the territory, with the assistance of Monaco Telecom.

Following the breakup of the SFR Yugoslavia in 1992, which had +38 as country code, Kosovo used the code +381, which was granted to FR Yugoslavia and later used by Serbia for fixed line telephone services. For mobile phone networks, Kosovo based providers used either the Monaco code +377 or the Slovenia code +386. Kosovo would gain its own calling code, +383 in 2017.

See also
United Nations Interim Administration Mission in Kosovo
Autonomous Province of Kosovo and Metohija
List of territories governed by the United Nations
United Nations Administered East Timor

References

External links
Archived website of the Joint Interim Administrative Structure
Archived Website of the Provisional Institutions of Self-Government
President of Kosovo
Prime Minister and Cabinet of Kosovo
Assembly of Kosovo
UNMIK - Official Gazette

 
Government of Kosovo
1999 in Kosovo
2000s in Kosovo
2010s in Kosovo